Ceratoserolis meridionalis is a species of serolid isopod found in Antarctica, including the Antarctic Peninsula and South Shetland Islands. Ceratoserolis meridionalis have been observed to dig borrows in the sand on the ocean floor to make its home.

References

External Links
 Sea Life Base https://www.sealifebase.ca/summary/Ceratoserolis-meridionalis.html 

Sphaeromatidea
Fauna of Antarctica
Crustaceans described in 1914